La Mission, French for "The Mission", may refer to:

La Mission, short name referring to Bordeaux wine producer Château La Mission Haut-Brion or its wine
La Mission (film), a 2009 American drama film

See also
The Mission (disambiguation)